Thomas Patrick Keating (1917–1984) was an English art restorer and famous art forger. Considered the most prolific and versatile art forger of the 20th century, he claimed to have faked more than 2,000 paintings by over 100 different artists. Total estimated profits from his forgeries amount in today's value to more than 10 million dollars .

Early life
Keating was born into a working-class family in South London. His father worked as a house painter, barely making enough to feed the household. At the age of fourteen, Keating passed an entrance exam for prestigious, nearby St Dunstan’s College, but was  crestfallen when his mother was told they’d have to pay the equivalent of a month’s wages for clothes and books. Keating started working as a delivery boy, a lather boy, a lift boy and a bell boy before he started working for the family business as a house painter. He was then enlisted as a boiler-stoker in World War II. After World War II, he was admitted into the art programme at Goldsmiths College, University of London. However, he did not receive a diploma, as he dropped out after only two years. In his college classes, his painting technique was praised, while his originality was regarded as insufficient. During Keating's two years at Goldsmiths College, he worked side jobs for art restorers. He even worked for the revered Hahn Brothers in Mayfair. Utilizing the skills he learned through these jobs, he began to restore paintings for a living (although he also had to keep working as a house-painter to make ends meet). He exhibited his own paintings, but failed to break into the art market. In order to prove himself as good as his heroes, Keating began painting in the style of them, especially Samuel Palmer.

He later married his wife, Hellen, from whom he also separated in his later years. They had a son named Douglas.

Keating studied at London’s National Gallery and the Tate.

Mid-life 
After dropping out of college, Keating was picked up by an art restorer named Fred Roberts. Roberts cared less about the ethics of art restoration than other restorers Keating had previously worked for. One of Keating's first jobs was to paint children around a maypole on a 19th-century painting by Thomas Sidney Cooper that had a large hole in it. Most art restorers would have simply filled in the cracks to preserve the authenticity of the painting. His career of forgery stemmed from Roberts' workshop when Keating criticized a painting done by Frank Moss Bennett. Roberts challenged him to recreate one of Bennett's paintings. At first Keating produced replicas of Bennett paintings, but he felt he could do even more. Keating recalls feeling as if he knew so much about Bennett that he could start creating his own works and pass them off as Bennett's. Keating created his own Bennett-like piece, and was so proud of it, that he signed it with his own name. When Roberts saw it, without consulting Keating, he changed the signature to F. M. Bennett and consigned it to the West End gallery. Keating did not find out until later, but said nothing.

According to Keating's account, Jane Kelly was instrumental in circulating his forgeries in the art market. With Palmer being one of his biggest inspirations, he created nearly twenty fake Palmers. Keating and Kelly then decided on the best three forgeries and Kelly took them to gallery specialists for auction.

In 1962, Keating counterfeited Edgar Degas' self-portrait.

In 1963, he started his own informal school, teaching teenagers painting techniques in exchange for tobacco or second-hand art books. This is where Keating, at the age of 46, met Jane Kelly, at the age of 16, a student of his. Kelly really enjoyed Keating's "class" and convinced her parents to pay Keating a pound/day for full-time instruction. She became especially attached to him and they ultimately became lovers and business partners. Four years later, the two began a life together in Suffolk, where they started an art restoration business.

Forger with a cause
Keating perceived the gallery system to be rotten – dominated, he said, by American "avant-garde fashion, with critics and dealers often conniving to line their own pockets at the expense both of naïve collectors and [of] impoverished artists".  Keating retaliated by creating forgeries to fool the experts, hoping to destabilize the system. Keating considered himself a socialist and used that mentality to rationalize his actions.

He planted "time-bombs" in his products. He left clues of the paintings' true nature for fellow art restorers or conservators to find. For example, he might write text onto the canvas with lead white before he began the painting, knowing that x-rays would later reveal the text. He deliberately added flaws or anachronisms, or used materials peculiar to the 20th century. Modern copyists of old masters use similar practices to guard against accusations of fraud.

In Keating's book The Fake's Progress, discussing the famous artists he forged, he stated that "it seemed disgraceful to me how many of them died in poverty". He reasoned that the poverty he had shared with these artists qualified him for the job. He added: "I flooded the market with the 'work' of Palmer and many others, not for gain, but simply as a protest against the merchants who make capital out of those I am proud to call my brother artists, both living and dead."

Technique
Mastering an artist's style and technique, as well as getting to know the artist very well, was a priority for Keating. He bristled at being called a forger, claiming that he never truly copied any pictures, rather he did new pictures that looked like they were done others. He bristled at being called a forger, claiming he never truly copied any pictures, rather he did new pictures that looked like they were done by others. In a 1977 BBC documentary he described a kind of hierarchy of terms for various types of imitation: a copy of a picture––an exact replica such as those often displayed in place of an original kept safe in a vault; a repaint––the result of heedless, heavy-handed restoration; a pastiche––a variation of an existing painting, or a new picture that mimics another artist’s style; a fake––a pastiche that has been doctored up to look like an original; and a forgery––a fake with another artist’s signature added and false provenance provided.

By far his favourite term for what he did was, Sexton Blake. The name of the long-running fictional detective was commonly used from the early twentieth century to mean, cake. Keating repurposed and popularized its use as rhyming slang for fake.

Keating's preferred approach in oil painting was a Venetian technique inspired by Titian's practice, although modified and fine-tuned along Dutch lines. The resultant paintings, while time-consuming to execute, have a richness and subtlety of colour and optical effect, and a variety of texture and depth of atmosphere unattainable in any other way. Unsurprisingly, his favourite artist was Rembrandt.

For a "Rembrandt", Keating might make pigments by boiling nuts for 10 hours and filtering the result through silk; such colouring would eventually fade, while genuine earth pigments would not. As a restorer he knew about the chemistry of cleaning-fluids; so, a layer of glycerine under the paint layer ensured that when any of his forged paintings needed to be cleaned (as all oil paintings need to be, eventually), the glycerin would dissolve, the paint layer would disintegrate, and the painting – now a ruin – would stand revealed as a fake.

Occasionally, as a restorer, he would come across frames with Christie's catalogue numbers still on them. To help in establishing false provenances for his forgeries, he would call the auction house to ask whose paintings they had contained – and would then paint the pictures according to the same artist's style.

Keating also produced a number of watercolours in the style of Samuel Palmer. To create a Palmer watercolor, Keating would mix the watercolor paints with glutinous tree gum, and cover the paintings with thick coats of varnish in order to get the right consistency and texture. And oil paintings by various European masters, including François Boucher, Edgar Degas, Jean-Honoré Fragonard, Thomas Gainsborough, Amedeo Modigliani, Rembrandt, Pierre-Auguste Renoir and Kees van Dongen.

Revealing the forger

In February 1970, Geraldine Norman, Sale Room Correspondent for The Times of London, reported the sale of a rare painting from Samuel Palmer’s Shoreham period, which mainly depicted moonlit scenes of shepherds and sheep from around his home in  Shoreham, Kent. A nearly life-sized photo of the picture accompanied the article. Entitled Sepham Barn, it was purchased for £9400, by Harold Leger, of Leger Galleries, Old Bond Street in London.

A month later, The Times published a letter from art expert David Gould claiming the picture to be a fake. Mrs. Norman continued to receive reports of more new Palmer pictures appearing in the market, along with claims from David Gould that all of them were fakes. In March of 1976, she began investigating them, enlisting the assistance of Palmer experts from the Ashmolean Museum, the Tate Museum, the British Museum, and the Fitzwilliam Museum, as well as author Geoffrey Grigson.  

In July 1976 the first of Norman's series of articles on fake Palmers was published on page one of The Times. Thirteen previously unknown Palmers that had appeared on the market in the past decade were all declared fake. Five of them had come from a single source: Jane Kelly. Norman was unable to reach Miss Kelly, but received several phone calls with tips including one from Miss Kelly's brother, who brought photos from Keating's studio, revealing that Tom Keating was the forger she was looking for.

Soon after, she drove out to the house that Kelly's brother had told her about, and met Keating. Keating welcomed her inside and told her all about his life as a restorer and artist, not discussing his life as a forger. He also spent much of the time ranting about his fight against the art establishment as a working-class socialist. A little over a week after their meeting (and a month after the first article), The Times published a further article written by Norman, writing about Keating's life and the many allegations of forgery against him. In response, Keating wrote: "I do not deny these allegations. In fact, I openly confess to having done them." He also declared that money was not his incentive. Though Norman was the one to expose him, Keating did not feel resentment towards her. Instead he said that she was sympathetic, respectful of his radical politics, and appreciative of him as an artist.

When an article published in The Times discussed the auctioneer's suspicions about their provenance, Keating confessed that they were his. He also estimated that more than 2,000 of his forgeries were in circulation. He had created them, he declared, as a protest against those art traders who get rich at the artist's expense. He also refused to list the forgeries.

The trial 
After Keating and Jane Kelly were finally arrested in 1977
, and both accused of conspiracy to defraud and obtaining payments through deception amounting to £21,416, Kelly pleaded guilty, promising to testify against Keating. Conversely, Keating pleaded innocent, on the basis that he was never intending to defraud, rather he was simply working under the masters' guidance and in their spirit. The charges were eventually dropped due to his poor health after he was severely injured in a motorcycle accident. He then contracted bronchitis in the hospital, which was exacerbated by a heart ailment and pulmonary disease, leading the doctors to believe that he was not going to survive. The prosecutor dropped the case, declaring nolle prosequi. Since Kelly had already pleaded guilty, she still had to serve her time in prison. However, Keating served no time, and shortly after the charges were dropped, Keating's health improved. Soon after, Keating was asked to star in a television show about the techniques needed to paint like the masters.

Aftermath
The same year Keating was arrested (1977), he published his autobiography with Geraldine and Frank Norman. A 2005 article in The Guardian stated that after the trial was halted, "the public warmed to him, believing him a charming old rogue." Years of chain smoking and the effects of breathing in the fumes of chemicals used in art restoring, such as ammonia, turpentine and methyl alcohol, together with the stress induced by the court case, had taken their toll. Through 1982 and 1983 Keating rallied, however, and although in fragile health, he presented television programmes on the techniques of old masters for Channel 4 in the UK.

A year before he died in Colchester at the age of 66, Keating stated in a television interview, that, in his opinion, he was not an especially good painter. His proponents would disagree. Keating is buried in the churchyard of the parish church of St Mary the Virgin at Dedham (a scene painted numerous times by Sir Alfred Munnings), and his last painting, The Angel of Dedham, is to be found in the Muniment Library of the church.

Even when he was alive, many art collectors and celebrities, such as the ex-heavyweight boxer Henry Cooper, had begun to collect Keating's work. After his death, his paintings became increasingly valuable collectibles. In the year of his death, Christie's auctioned 204 of his works. The amount raised from the auction was not announced, but it is said to have been considerable. Even his known forgeries, described in catalogues as "after" Gainsborough or Cézanne, attain high prices. Nowadays, Keatings sell for tens of thousands of pounds.

And perhaps even more interesting, there are fake Keatings. The 2005 Guardian article states, "Dodgy paintings in Keating's original style, proudly bearing what-looks-like his signature, are finding their way into the market. If they manage to fool, they can claim £5,000 to £10,000. But if uncovered they are virtually worthless, much like Keating's 20 years ago. If you can pick them up for next to nothing, they may be a better investment than an original Keating counterfeit."

Works 
Major restoration of the Louis Laguerre murals depicting the Battle of Blenheim in the West Staircase at Marlborough House.

The Hay Wain in Reverse, his best known painting, is a pastiche of John Constable's celebrated, The Hay Wain. It is reportedly on display in the Granary Barn and Museum in Flatford.

A modest painting of the Greek sun god Helios in his chariot adorns a sign over The Sun Inn, in Dedham, Essex.

Tom Keating on Painters (television show) 
After Keating's legal suit was dropped, he was asked to star in a television show called Tom Keating on Painters. The show started airing in 1982 at 6:30 p.m. on weekdays to attract a family audience. On this show, Keating demonstrated how to paint like the masters, illustrating the techniques and processes of painting like artists, such as Titian, Rembrandt, Claude Monet, and John Constable.

In popular culture
In the 2002 film The Good Thief Nick Nolte's character claims to own a painting Picasso did for him after losing a bet, when it is exposed as a fake he claims it was painted for him by Keating after meeting in a betting shop.

The fourth track, titled "Judas Unrepentant", on progressive rock band Big Big Train's 2012 album English Electric (Part One) is based on the life of Keating as an artist. According to the blog of Big Big Train vocalist David Longdon, the song walks through Keating's artistic life from his time as a restorer to his death and posthumous fame.

Further reading
 Tom Keating, Geraldine Norman and Frank Norman, The Fake's Progress: The Tom Keating Story, London: Hutchinson and Co., 1977.
 Associated Press obituary for Tom Keating
 Keats, Jonathon, Forged: Why Fakes Are the Great Art of Our Age, New York: Oxford University Press., 2013. (Excerpt on Tom Keating published by Forbes, 13 December 2012).
Paci, P., "A Forger's Career, Tom Keating – UK," in Masters of the Swindle: True Stories of Con Men, Cheaters & Scam Artists, edited by Gianni Morelli and Chiara Schiavano, Milano, Italy: White Star Publishers, 2016, pages 180–84.

References

1917 births
1984 deaths
English art forgers
People from Lewisham
House painters
Conservator-restorers
Alumni of Goldsmiths, University of London
Painters from London
Television personalities from London
English male painters
English socialists
British military personnel of World War II